Trout Creek is a  long tributary of the Deschutes River in the U.S. state of Oregon. Arising in the Ochoco Mountains, it flows north and then west to its confluence with the Deschutes River.

Course
Trout Creek's headwaters are in the western Ochoco Mountains, northeast of Prineville. It flows north, gathering minor tributaries such as Auger Creek and Amity Creek. The creek turns northwest and then west near the ghost town of Ashwood, straddling the Jefferson/Wasco county line. It receives Antelope Creek on the right bank. Highway 97 crosses the creek near Willowdale. Several miles downstream, Trout Creek receives Hay and Mud Springs creeks on the left bank.

Watershed
Trout Creek drains  of central Oregon. Eighty-eight percent of the watershed is privately owned, while the remaining twelve percent is owned by the United States Forest Service, Bureau of Land Management, and United States Department of Agriculture. Eighty-six percent is rangeland, twelve percent is forested, two percent is used for agriculture, and less than one percent is urban or rural.

History
Humans first arrived in the Trout Creek area around 10,000 years ago. A pit-house discovered near Willowdale dates back at least 5,000 years. The first European Americans to arrive in the area were fur traders in the 1820s, including a group led by Peter Skene Ogden. The first settlers arrived in the 1860s. In 1896 and 1897, gold and silver were discovered. The Ashwood post office opened in 1898, and it quickly expanded as silver and cinnabar mines operated in the area. Many homesteaders arrived in the area in the early 1910s, and cinnabar production peaked in the 1960s. After major floods in 1964, the United States Army Corps of Engineers straightened portions of Trout Creek, creating berms that have obstructed some of the creek's smaller tributaries.

See also
List of rivers of Oregon
List of longest streams of Oregon

References

External links
Hidden Beauty: The Palisades of Trout Creek  Video produced by Oregon Field Guide

Rivers of Oregon
Rivers of Crook County, Oregon
Rivers of Jefferson County, Oregon
Rivers of Wasco County, Oregon